Carol Bonomo Albright (born 1938) is an American author, editor, and educator in the field of Italian-American studies. She has published many books and articles on the subject, and taught classes at the University of Rhode Island and the Harvard University Extension School. She was editor-in-chief of Italian Americana, a peer-reviewed cultural/historical journal, for over 25 years.

Life 
Carol Bonomo Albright was born in Greenwich Village, New York, 1938. She attended St. Joseph Academy. Her parents were immigrants from the Calabria region of Southern Italy. She earned an M.A. degree from Brown University, and has received grants from the Danforth Foundation of Higher Education and the National Science Foundation for Medical Education.

Albright's essays, reviews, and other writings have appeared in many journals, such as PMLA, The Providence Journal, MELUS, and the Journal of American Ethnic Studies; in anthologies, such as Our Roots Are Deep With Passion: Creative Nonfiction Collects New Essays by Italian-American Writers (2015), Voices of the Daughters (1989), and Helen Barolini's The Dream Book: An Anthology of Writings by Italian American Women (1985); and in other books, such as The Italian American Experience: An Encyclopedia (2003) and Social Pluralism and Literary History: The Literature of the Italian Emigration (1996). In 2004 she co-edited an annotated edition of two novels by Joseph Rocchietti, one of which, Lorenzo and Oonalaska (1835), is the earliest known novel by an Italian-American. She also published a memoir in 2009.

Albright was editor-in-chief of Italian Americana from 1989 to 2015, and served two terms as vice president of the American Italian Historical Association.

Works 
Author:
 My Greenwich Village and the Italian American Community (2009)
 With Ned Balbo and Edvige Giunta, Padri : tre memoir italo americani (2009)
 Italian Immigrants Go West: The Impact of Locale on Ethnicity (2003)
 Italian American Autobiographies (1993)

Editor:
 American Woman, Italian Style: Italian Americana's Best Writings on Women (2011)
 Wild Dreams: The Best of Italian Americana (2008)
 Republican Ideals in the Selected Literary Works of Italian-American Joseph Rocchietti, 1835/1845 (2004)

References 

1938 births
Living people
Brown University alumni
American writers of Italian descent
20th-century American women writers
21st-century American women writers
American book editors
American magazine editors
American women non-fiction writers
20th-century American non-fiction writers
21st-century American non-fiction writers
Women magazine editors